Dowling is a census-designated place (CDP) in Baltimore Township in Barry County, Michigan, United States. The population was 374 at the 2010 census.

History
The settlement was informally named "Baltimore" as early as 1842 in memory of the home of prominent settlers. A post office named Baltimore was established in May 1850. The name was changed to Dowling in March 1880.

Geography

Dowling is located southeast of the center of Barry County. The center of town is located at the intersection of state highway M-37 and East Dowling Road. M-37 leads north  to Hastings, the Barry County seat, and south  to downtown Battle Creek.

The southern edge of the CDP is the border with Johnstown Township.

Demographics

References

External links
Baltimore Township

Census-designated places in Michigan
Unincorporated communities in Barry County, Michigan
Grand Rapids metropolitan area